Shellsburg is a city in Benton County, Iowa, United States. The population was 961 at the time of the 2020 census.  It is part of the Cedar Rapids Metropolitan Statistical Area.

History
Shellsburg was founded in 1854.

Geography

Demographics

2010 census
At the 2010 census there were 983 people, 428 households, and 276 families living in the city. The racial makup of the city was 96.7% White, 0.7% African American, 1.0% Native American, 0.1% Asian, 0.1% Pacific Islander, and 1.3% from two or more races. Hispanic or Latino of any race were 0.5%.

Of the 428 households 27.8% had children under the age of 18 living with them, 51.9% were married couples living together, 8.9% had a female householder with no husband present, 3.7% had a male householder with no wife present, and 35.5% were non-families. 30.1% of households were one person and 15.4% were one person aged 65 or older. The average household size was 2.24 and the average family size was 2.74.

The median age was 44.6 years. 20.9% of residents were under the age of 18; 6.2% were between the ages of 18 and 24; 23.5% were from 25 to 44; 30.1% were from 45 to 64; and 19.3% were 65 or older. The gender makeup of the city was 48.5% male and 51.5% female.

2000 census
At the 2000 census there were 938 people, 356 households, and 260 families living in the city. The racial makup of the city was 99.04% White, 0.32% Native American, 0.32% Asian, and 0.32% from two or more races. Hispanic or Latino of any race were 0.43%.

Of the 356 households 36.5% had children under the age of 18 living with them, 63.5% were married couples living together, 5.6% had a female householder with no husband present, and 26.7% were non-families. 21.9% of households were one person and 8.4% were one person aged 65 or older. The average household size was 2.57 and the average family size was 3.00.

The age distribution was 27.5% under the age of 18, 5.0% from 18 to 24, 33.6% from 25 to 44, 20.8% from 45 to 64, and 13.1% 65 or older. The median age was 36 years. For every 100 females, there were 106.6 males. For every 100 females age 18 and over, there were 97.1 males.

The median household income was $41,912 and the median family income  was $49,219. Males had a median income of $36,176 versus $24,250 for females. The per capita income for the city was $17,352. About 8.1% of families and 8.3% of the population were below the poverty line, including 11.6% of those under age 18 and 11.4% of those age 65 or over.

Education
The Vinton-Shellsburg Community School District operates public schools. The district was established on July 1, 1993 by the merger of the Vinton Community School District and the Shellsburg Community School District.

Media
In June 2006, Shellsburg became one of several locations used to film the movie The Final Season, a story that follows the success of a small town school baseball team before consolidating with a neighboring school district. Portions of downtown Shellsburg were used to portray the nearby town of Norway, in which the movie is based.

References

Cities in Iowa
Cities in Benton County, Iowa
Cedar Rapids, Iowa metropolitan area
1854 establishments in Iowa
Populated places established in 1854